The Hilbert Hawks football team represents Hilbert College in college football at the NCAA Division III level. The Hawks are in the Empire 8. The Hawks play their home games at St. Francis High School in Hamburg, New York.

Their head coach is Ted Egger, who took over the position for the team's second season in 2023.

Conference affiliations
 Independent (2022)
 Empire 8 (2023–present)

List of head coaches

Key

Coaches

Year-by-year results

Notes

References

 
American football teams established in 2022
2022 establishments in New York (state)